Tāneatua is a small town in the Bay of Plenty region of New Zealand's North Island, 13 kilometres south of Whakatāne.  State Highway 2 passes through the town on its route between Edgecumbe and Ōpōtiki. The small settlements of Ruatoki and Waimana are to the south and south-east of Tāneatua.

The Whakatāne River runs to the west of Tāneatua, while the Tauranga River (also formerly called the Waimana River) flows south of the township and joins the Whakatāne River just to the southwest of Tāneatua. 

Te Kura Whare, the headquarters of the Ngāi Tūhoe tribe's representative body, Te Uru Taumatua, is on the highway at the north-western end of Tāneatua. It includes a library, gallery, archive and large tribal meeting chamber.

The now closed Tāneatua Branch railway line terminated in Tāneatua. Earlier considered part of the East Coast Main Trunk Railway, it became a branch line off the main line from Hawkens Junction, northwest of Edgecumbe. The Tāneatua railway station has been demolished.

Demographics
Tāneatua is part of the larger Wainui statistical area.

Tāneatua had a population of 897 at the 2018 New Zealand census, an increase of 111 people (14.1%) since the 2013 census, and an increase of 105 people (13.3%) since the 2006 census. There were 222 households, comprising 447 males and 447 females, giving a sex ratio of 1.0 males per female, with 291 people (32.4%) aged under 15 years, 192 (21.4%) aged 15 to 29, 345 (38.5%) aged 30 to 64, and 78 (8.7%) aged 65 or older.

Ethnicities were 17.1% European/Pākehā, 93.3% Māori, 5.4% Pacific peoples, and 1.0% Asian. People may identify with more than one ethnicity.

Although some people chose not to answer the census's question about religious affiliation, 35.5% had no religion, 28.1% were Christian, 31.1% had Māori religious beliefs, 0.7% were Buddhist and 1.0% had other religions.

Of those at least 15 years old, 84 (13.9%) people had a bachelor's or higher degree, and 129 (21.3%) people had no formal qualifications. 51 people (8.4%) earned over $70,000 compared to 17.2% nationally. The employment status of those at least 15 was that 246 (40.6%) people were employed full-time, 126 (20.8%) were part-time, and 60 (9.9%) were unemployed.

Wainui statistical area

Wainui had a population of 1,497 at the 2018 New Zealand census, an increase of 132 people (9.7%) since the 2013 census, and an increase of 150 people (11.1%) since the 2006 census. There were 432 households, comprising 744 males and 753 females, giving a sex ratio of 0.99 males per female. The median age was 33.4 years (compared with 37.4 years nationally), with 405 people (27.1%) aged under 15 years, 288 (19.2%) aged 15 to 29, 651 (43.5%) aged 30 to 64, and 156 (10.4%) aged 65 or older.

Ethnicities were 44.1% European/Pākehā, 67.3% Māori, 3.4% Pacific peoples, 1.0% Asian, and 0.8% other ethnicities. People may identify with more than one ethnicity.

The percentage of people born overseas was 7.0, compared with 27.1% nationally.

Although some people chose not to answer the census's question about religious affiliation, 44.3% had no religion, 28.7% were Christian, 20.4% had Māori religious beliefs, 0.2% were Buddhist and 1.0% had other religions.

Of those at least 15 years old, 192 (17.6%) people had a bachelor's or higher degree, and 207 (19.0%) people had no formal qualifications. The median income was $26,600, compared with $31,800 nationally. 138 people (12.6%) earned over $70,000 compared to 17.2% nationally. The employment status of those at least 15 was that 501 (45.9%) people were employed full-time, 213 (19.5%) were part-time, and 75 (6.9%) were unemployed.

Education

References 

Whakatane District
Populated places in the Bay of Plenty Region